Lisa O'Neill (born 1982) is an Irish singer-songwriter.

Early life
O'Neill grew up in Ballyhaise, County Cavan.

Career
O'Neill moved to Dublin aged 18 to study music at Ballyfermot College. For seven years after that, she worked in the service industry in places like Eddie Rocket's and Bewley's of Grafton Street, continuing to write songs. Her first album, Has An Album, was released in 2009.

In 2011, David Gray invited her to open for him on his American and Canadian tour and she was also part of his touring band for a time.

Her 2013 and 2018 albums were nominated for the Choice Music Prize. She played at the 2016 Vancouver Folk Music Festival.

In 2016, O'Neill made an appearance on the debut album by the trio Yorkston/Thorne/Khan, Everything Sacred. In the album's liner notes, singer James Yorkston reveals that the possibility of calling the group Yorkston/Thorne/Khan/O'Neill was discussed, but that she saw herself as a guest.

In 2017, O'Neill was featured in the film Song of Granite, in which she sang "The Galway Shawl".

O'Neill won Best Original Folk Track with "Rock the Machine" (from her album Heard a Long Gone Song) at the 2019 RTÉ Radio 1 Folk Awards, and was nominated for Folk Singer of the Year, Best Traditional Track, Best Original Track and Best Album at the BBC Radio 2 Folk Awards in the same year.

Discography

Studio albums

EP
The Wren, the Wren (2019)

References

External links
Official website
Lisa O'Neill on discogs
Lisa O'Neill on Bandcamp
Lisa O'Neill on YouTube

1982 births
20th-century Irish people
21st-century Irish people
Living people
Musicians from County Cavan
Irish folk singers
Folk guitarists
Irish women singers